Poienile may refer to:

Poienile, a village in the town of Pătârlagele, Buzău County, Romania
Poienile, a village in Bulzești Commune, Dolj County, Romania
Poienile, a village in Dagâța Commune, Iaşi County, Romania
Poienile, a village in Predeal-Sărari Commune, Prahova County, Romania
Poienile, a village in Gura Caliței Commune, Vrancea County, Romania

See also
Poienile de sub Munte, a commune in Maramureș County
Poienile Izei, a commune in Maramureș County
Poienile-Mogoş, a village in Mogoș Commune, Alba County
Poienile Zagrei, a village in Zagra Commune, Bistriţa-Năsăud County
Poienile Boinei, a village in Şopotu Nou Commune, Caraş-Severin County
Poienile Oancei, a village in Stănița Commune, Neamţ County